Florian Hoffmeister,  (born 1970), is a German cinematographer and director, best known for his work on Tár, which earned him an Academy Award nomination for Best Cinematography. Projects he has worked on include Five Days, House of Saddam and AMC's The Terror. He has collaborated with director Terence Davies on two occasions, working on The Deep Blue Sea and A Quiet Passion. His other credits include In Secret, Mortdecai and Johnny English Strikes Again.

Career
Hoffmeister graduated from high school in 1989 and got his first job as an intern electrician on a film production. He studied directing and cinematography at Berlin's German Film and Television Academy. His first film,  won him a Silver Leopard for Best First Feature Film at the Locarno International Film Festival. A major breakthrough would come in 2011 when he served as the primary cinematographer on the British television mini-series Great Expectations, winning him an Emmy, a BAFTA, and the ASC award. He was listed by Variety in its "10 Cinematographers to Watch" list.

In 2016, he directed , a film based on the novel by Katharina Hacker. The film is notably in black and white, which Hoffmeister explained as a strategy to "change how the audience in the theatres would view reality and whether the film would strike an emotional impact on them".

Hoffmeister was hired to shoot Scott Cooper's horror film Antlers.

Filmography

As cinematographer
Feature Films

Television

As director

References

External links
 Official Website
 

1970 births
Living people
Mass media people from Braunschweig